Hewelsfield and Brockweir is a civil parish in Forest of Dean District, Gloucestershire.  The parish was called Hewelsfield until 1994.  It contains two distinct villages, Hewelsfield and Brockweir, with scattered settlement on Hewelsfield common.

History
Until 1842 Hewelsfield parish was in three parts.  The main part comprised farmland on high ground, having Hewelsfield village as its centre. Below and to the west, a detached part of only a few acres, Cutt's Orchard, lay on the north side of Brockweir brook.  On the bank of the Wye another detached part included the part of Brockweir village lying north of Brockweir brook.  The part of the village south of the brook (which included the Moravian Church) was in Woolaston parish.

In 1842 an adjoining tract of extraparochial land, which became known as Hewelsfield common, was added to Hewelsfield for civil parish purposes, uniting the detached parts of the parish.  The parish was further enlarged in 1935 by the addition of an arm of Woolaston parish, extending down the south side of the valley of Brockweir brook to the Wye at the village of Brockweir.

Parish council
Hewelsfield and Brockweir Parish Council consists of 7 Councillors and a Clerk.  It meets monthly, except in August, at the Brockweir and Hewelsfield Village Shop.

Listed Buildings
The parish contains 36 listed buildings: two churches (St Mary Magdalen, Hewelsfield and Brockweir Moravian Church), a churchyard wall, 17 chest tombs (in the churchyard of St Mary Magdalen, Hewelsfield), a pair of limekilns, a milepost, two bridges and 12 houses.

Lists of the listed buildings can be found in the Wikipedia articles on the villages of Hewelsfield and Brockweir.

Scheduled Monuments
The parish contains six scheduled monuments: five sections of Offa's Dyke, and Hewelsfield Motte.

Community Shop
The parish is served by the Brockweir and Hewelsfield Village Shop and Café, a non-profit making community enterprise, staffed by volunteers from the local community.

References

External links
Hewelsfield and Brockweir Parish Council
Brockweir and Hewelsfield Village Shop and Café

Civil parishes in Gloucestershire
Forest of Dean